Julien Benneteau and Nicolas Mahut were the defending champions, but lost in the semifinals to Raven Klaasen and Michael Venus.

Klaasen and Venus went on to win the title, defeating Marcus Daniell and Dominic Inglot in the final, 6–7(2–7), 6–3, [10–4].

Seeds

Draw

Draw

References
 Main draw

Open 13 Provence - Doubles
2018 Doubles